Julian Lorenzo de Mey is a Dutch international cricketer. He is a right-handed and a slow left arm orthodox orthodox bowler.

In October 2020, he was named in the Netherlands' winter training squad. He also represented the HBS cricket team in the 2020 Dutch Twenty20 Cup.

In March 2021, he earned his maiden call-up to the Netherlands national cricket team, for the 2020–21 Nepal Tri-Nation Series. He made his Twenty20 International (T20I) debut against Nepal during the inaugural match of the tri-nation series, in which he took a wicket. In May 2021, he was named in the Netherlands' squad for their home series against Scotland, although he is yet to make his One Day International (ODI) debut.

References

External links 

Dutch cricketers
Netherlands Twenty20 International cricketers
Living people

Year of birth missing (living people)